Thirst Buster may refer to:

Thirst Buster (Shell Canada), a slushy beverage sold by Shell Canada
Thirst Buster, a former brand of fountain drinks sold at Circle K (renamed to Polar Pop in 2009)